The Wollongong Advertiser is a free community newspaper published by Australian Community Media for the residents of the Wollongong and Shellharbour Local Government Areas in New South Wales, Australia.

The newspaper has a circulation of just under 100,000 and focuses on local and regional news.

Until 2012, the newspaper was published in three editions: Wollongong Advertiser, Shellharbour Advertiser, and Kiama Advertiser.

In 2012, the Kiama and Shellharbour editions of the Advertiser were discontinued.

History 
The Advertiser began in February 1982 as the Wollongong-Shellharbour Advertiser. 
Until 2012, the newspaper was published in three editions: Wollongong Advertiser, Shellharbour Advertiser and Kiama Advertiser. Fairfax Media purchased the Kiama Independent in 2011 and the Lake Times in 2012. When management of these newspapers transferred to the Illawarra Mercury in 2012, the Kiama and Shellharbour editions of The Advertiser were discontinued.

In 2015, the Wollongong Advertiser and the Lake Times were merged by Fairfax Media to become The Advertiser & Lake Times.

References

External links 
 The Advertiser - Website

Wollongong
Newspapers published in New South Wales
1982 establishments in Australia
Weekly newspapers published in Australia